List of Danish wind turbine manufacturers.

Micon (Moerup Industrial Windmill Construction Company) (1982–1997)  merged with NEG in 1997
NEG Micon (1997–2004)  merged from NEG and Micon in 1997, merged with Vestas in 2004
Nordex (1985–present)  moved to Germany
Nordtank Energy Group (NEG), formerly Nordtank (1980–1997)  merged with Micon in 1997
Siemens Wind Power  formerly Danregn Vindkraft and then Bonus Energy A/S between 1980 and takeover in 2004
Vestas (1979–present)  merged with NEG Micon in 2004

See also  
 List of wind turbine manufacturers

References 
History

 Danish
Engine manufacturers of Denmark
Lists of companies of Denmark